The Incola Hotel was a luxury hotel constructed by the Canadian Pacific Railway (CPR) company in the city of Penticton, British Columbia, Canada to provide quality accommodation for those traveling on the CPR mainline or steamships and passing through Penticton. The hotel opened in 1912 and served the city for 70 years before eventually being demolished in 1981.

Construction
Construction began on August 2, 1911 on a 1.23 acre site at 100 Lakeshore Drive. The cost was estimated at $100 000. A liquor license was granted on December 11, 1911 and the hotel opened on August 19, 1912. The building was of black and white half-timbre pattern, with a veranda and decorated in mock Tudor. Furniture was in solid oak and upholstered in leather. The four floors housed 62 rooms (14 had private baths), five public baths, a sun parlor, ladies' parlor, reading room, fireplace, billiard room, and music room. The hotel's first manager was W.J. Richardson from the Queen's Hotel in Toronto, Ontario. The hotel was built to accommodate passengers from the trains and CPR steamships such as the SS Sicamous.

Amenities
The Incola was a luxurious hotel with an elegant dining hall, as described by an Okanagan resident in the 1920s: "Dinner at the Incola hotel was a real treat...the dining room at the Incola was on a second storey level, so as to give you a lovely view of the lake, so you went up quite a broad flight of steps to reach the entrance in those days. The room was quite large and impeccably furnished with white linen-covered tables, high-back chairs, lovely shining silver and glassware, as well as imported English china...and of course there were the equally impeccable dressed men waiters...The food was delicious and served in a leisurely fashion. There were English meat pies, seafood, and of course, always 'Roast Beef with Yorkshire Pudding.' And for dessert there was a wide variety, especially of tarts and pastries usually wheeled in on a tea cart, from which you could 'choose your pick.' It was the 'upper-crust atmosphere' they managed to produce, however, which left you with the glorious feeling of 'being somebody' that was the highlight of the occasion, and was such a delightful contrast to the more rough and tumble atmosphere on the American side." 
The hotel also had telephones starting from the early 1930s.  In the account of worker in charge of installing them: "In the early thirties the Incola Hotel management decided that telephones should be installed in each room to replace the old wooden push button buzzers used to summon a busboy. When called, the busboy had to climb from one to four floors to ascertain the guest's needs and repeat the trip with the necessary supplies. It did not make for fast service. When the order was given to the Okanagan Telephone Company to go ahead, Cliff Greyell, manager of the Penticton office ordered...one switchboard, 80 telephones, wire and fuse protectors for the incoming trunk lines. My job was to install the telephones in the rooms and different parts of the hotel. The job proved quite an experience for me, especially wiring some of the rooms while the guests were still in the rooms and didn't mind a bit about being interrupted."

Events
Receptions, concerts, and dances were often held in the hotel. Passengers from the train and boats provided business and by 1928, there was lawn bowling on the grounds. During the 1930s, bands and orchestras often performed. The hotel also held events such as Board of Trade and Canadian Club dinners, Gyro, Kiwanis and Rotary luncheons, parties, and weddings, making the hotel the center of community life for decades.

Decline
Decline began in 1948 with the opening of highways that increased Penticton's role as a resort and convention center. Rail business decreased and newer hotels were built. Between 1966 and 1975, the Incola underwent four ownership changes and new extensions and modifications erased the hotel's original appearance. Neglect led to safety hazards, resulting in the fire marshal's order to close the top floor in 1963. Two fires broke out in 1978, leaving a hole in the roof that was not repaired. Broken windows were boarded up and outside walls began to rot due to the absence of drain pipes. By the late 1970s, the premises had become a gathering place for bikers, minors, and regular performances by strippers that destroyed the hotel's reputation. It closed on August 27, 1979, and was demolished in March 1981.

See also
 Canadian Pacific Railway
 Penticton

References

Demolished buildings and structures in British Columbia
Buildings and structures in Penticton
Hotels in British Columbia
Canadian Pacific Railway hotels
Demolished hotels
Buildings and structures demolished in 1981